This Island is the third and final album by American dance-punk band Le Tigre. It was released by Universal Records on October 19, 2004. The album was the band's only one for a major label and reached number 130 on the Billboard 200. As of 2008, the album had sold 90,000 copies.

Recording and production 
Following the conclusion of the Feminist Sweepstakes touring cycle in 2002, the band envisioned a different approach to their recording.  They decided to remove studio deadlines, and instead of going to North Carolina to record material (because New York recording studios were too expensive), the band used their touring money to set up their own individual home studios with Pro Tools in Manhattan, New York, and were switching around hard drives of music while working on the record. "It’s done so much", JD Samson commented on the new recording approach. "One thing is that it lends it self so well to the bands music and it's a non-linear process where we can just patch stuff up and also having the time. But plus it made us stuck for years on the record because we were so picky."

As there were no deadlines for studio times or pressures from their label at the time, Mr. Lady, the band had the ability to polish their sound beyond the DIY sound of their previous records. “It’s slightly more produced", Kathleen Hanna commented on the record's sound. "Just because we spent a lot more time on each individual song and made sure we had all the frequencies covered."  The band chose Nick Sansano as the album's producer, due to his work mixing Rob Base & DJ E-Z Rock's "It Takes Two"; "It pretty much sealed the deal for us", Johanna Fateman commented.

Composition and songs 
This Island has been described as poppier than previous Le Tigre records, and was something the band had been developing since their last album Feminist Sweepstakes. "The writing was emerging as poppier and accessible", Hanna said in an interview to The Guardian. "I remember saying to the others, 'All the songs I'm writing are pop songs. What are you writing? Because if we're going on a major label, let this be the record.'"

Seconds 
"Seconds" is a fast punk song about then-president George W. Bush. Hanna, a strong opponent of Bush, commented on him and the song:"You know that feeling when you see him on TV and you feel like you're going to throw up?" I feel like I can't look at him anymore because I get so physically freaked out and upset. I don't wanna be one of those "tune out, turn off" people, but I don't even know if I can mentally take watching him lie anymore. It makes me so angry and upset."

Tell You Now 
"Tell You Now" is the only song on the album produced by Ric Ocasek of The Cars. Ocasek had an active involvement in crafting the song and also helped the band shape their sound by giving the band a few "pop tricks". Fateman later commented on working with Ocasek: "That was an interesting experience working with him, but we never worked with anyone that early in the process who listened to our demo of the song and had structuring ideas and had someone who’s really a master of the pop formula. Having someone like that in the process was really rewarding and totally different, but really interesting."

The song was singled out by many publications, including Pitchfork, as the album's best song.

New Kicks 
"New Kicks" was described by the band's publicist as "a dance anthem made up of samples of anti-war speeches by Susan Sarandon, Al Sharpton, and others, punctuated by a 'Peace Up, War Down!' chant". The song has drawn similarities to their song "Dyke March 2001" from Feminist Sweepstakes due to its sampled chant approach. The songs' chants were recorded at the 15 February anti-war protests in Manhattan by JD Samson.  It was released as the album's first single by the label ahead of the 2004 Republican National Convention, something the band was not expecting to happen. The song's music video featured the band wearing "Stop Bush Now!" outfits, which despite being warned against by Universal as being too partisan, they wore anyway.

Viz 
"Viz" is about JD Samson, and her experiences as a butch lesbian.

Release 

In 2004, the band's label, Mr. Lady, notified the band ahead of time they were going to stop releasing new music. After some discussion, Le Tigre decided signed to major label Universal Records through Strummer, an imprint label run by Gary Gersh, the ex-president of Capitol Records.

The band decided to sign to a major label due to the band's exhaustion of touring with no support, and because it would have given the band's politics and message greater exposure into the mainstream. "It's about time a feminist group got a little love from the mainstream,", Kathleen Hanna said, defending Le Tigre's move to a major label. "It made sense on a lot of levels, and all of our friends and close fans have been incredibly supportive."

This Island was released on October 19, 2004 by Strummer/Universal Records, two weeks before the 2004 US presidential election. The vinyl release was handled by the band's own label, Le Tigre Records, and distributed by Touch & Go Records.

Commercial performance 
The album peaked at number 130 on the Billboard 200 chart, remaining on the chart for one week.  As of 2008, the album has sold 90,000 copies in the US.

The album's singles "TKO" and "After Dark" peaked at numbers 50 and 63 in the UK, respectively.

Critical reception

This Island received generally favorable reviews from music critics. On Metacritic, which assigns a normalized rating out of 100 to reviews from mainstream critics, the album received an average score of 66, based on 28 reviews.

Katie Zerwas of PopMatters gave the band high praise for utilizing its new-found mainstream backing to craft dance-rock material that's both entertaining and mindful of their stance on gender politics, concluding with, "Smart and sexy, political and provocative, Le Tigre is the best and brightest of feminist rock." Rob Theakston of AllMusic also applauded the band for putting a commercial sheen over their usual new wave formula while still retaining their ability to deliver biting commentary, concluding that "Of all the groups Universal could have chosen from this tired, depressing movement, they certainly chose the most honest and promising of the bunch and one whose full potential is just now starting to flourish." Pat Blashill of Rolling Stone praised the upbeat production and confident lyricism for voicing the band's social problems, saying that "If Clear Channel didn't have the airwaves on lockdown, This Island would turn the thirteen-year-old girls of this nation into singing, stomping, rioting mobs demanding r-e-s-p-e-c-t."

Alex Petridis of The Guardian was mixed about the album, saying that the production captures the band's live shows and political message but was put off by the vocal delivery, concluding that "money cannot change vocalist Kathleen Hanna's tendency to sound snotty rather than angry, which frequently leaves you feeling like you're being harangued by Buffy the Vampire Slayers right-on classmate." Pitchfork writer Nick Sylvester criticized the album for taking less risks with the band's attempt at commercializing its genre-hopping political tracks to the mainstream masses, concluding that it "ends up being merely a squandered opportunity, which sadly sums up This Island as well." Derek Miller of Stylus Magazine felt the album toned down the band's penchant for delivering upbeat socio-political tracks that comes across more slick but soulless in its social message, saying that, "This Island is expertly produced at times, with a crisp, micro-edged flaunt that belies their gauche political discourse."

Promotion, touring and aftermath 
The band promoted the record through tours in North America and Europe from 2004 to 2005. To support the record, Le Tigre appeared at the Coachella Valley Music and Arts Festival 2004. They were also scheduled to appear at Lollapalooza 2004, but was cancelled due to the festival's poor ticket sales. The band also made an appearance on Late Night with Conan O'Brien, performing "TKO" on April 15, 2005.

Le Tigre also released a remix album, This Island Remixes, in 2005 on Le Tigre Records.

Track listing

Charts

References

External links 

 

2004 albums
Albums produced by Ric Ocasek
Le Tigre albums
Universal Records albums